This is a list of flags used in Eritrea. For more information about the national flag, visit the article Flag of Eritrea.

National flag

Governmental flag

Ethnic groups flags

Historical flags

See also 

 Emblem of Eritrea
 Flag of Eritrea

References 

Lists and galleries of flags
Flags